Grand Lake St. Marys Seaplane Base  is a public use seaplane base located five nautical miles (9 km) southwest of the central business district of St. Marys, a city in Auglaize County, Ohio, United States. It is owned by the Ohio Division of Parks & Recreation and is located on Grand Lake St. Marys, a lake and state park in Ohio.

Facilities and aircraft 
It has one seaplane landing area designated 9/27 and measuring 7,000 x 4,000 ft (2,134 x 1,219 m).

References

External links 

Airports in Ohio
Seaplane bases in the United States
Transportation in Auglaize County, Ohio
Buildings and structures in Auglaize County, Ohio